Leucadendron arcuatum, the red-edge conebush, is a flower-bearing shrub that belongs to the genus Leucadendron and forms part of the fynbos. The plant is native to the Western Cape, South Africa.

Description

Distribution and habitat
The plant occurs in Cederberg, Olifants River, Kouebokkeveld Mountains, Groot Winterhoek, Elandskloof, Hexrivierberge, Keeromsberg, and Kwadouwberge.

Gallery

References

Sources
Threatened Species Programme | SANBI Red List of South African Plants
Red-edged Conebush

IUCN Red List least concern species
arcuatum